Penguin Island  may refer to:

Islands

Antarctica
 Alternative name for the Afuera Islands
 Penguin Island (South Shetland Islands)

Australia
 Penguin Island (South Australia)
 Penguin Island (Tasmania)
 Penguin Islet (Tasmania)
 Penguin Island (Western Australia)

Canada
 Penguin Island, Newfoundland, now known as Funk Island

New Zealand
 Penguin Island, New Zealand, off D'Urville Island, New Zealand

Arts and entertainment
 Penguin Island (novel), a satirical novel by Anatole France (1908)
 Penguin Island (TV series), a 6-part Australian documentary miniseries

See also
 Penguin Islands, Namibia
 Penguin Islands (Newfoundland and Labrador), Canada
 Île des Pingouins, Crozet Archipelago, South Indian Ocean